Frith is an obsolete English word meaning peace or refuge.

Frith may also refer to:
 Frith (surname)
 Frith Street, London
 Frith van der Merwe (born 1964), South African athlete
 The Frith, an Iron Age hillfort near Silchester, Hampshire, England
 a town in Montserrat
 Frith, the Sun-god in the legends of the rabbits of Watership Down

See also